The Chapel Hill Consensus Conferences (CHCC) (1994 and 2012) are a pair of international conferences which addressed the need of standardized classification system for systemic vasculitides.

2012 Revised International Chapel Hill Consensus Conference Nomenclature of Vasculitides

References

Conferences